Jim Courier and Javier Sánchez were the defending champions, but lost in the second round this year.

Steve DeVries and David Macpherson won the title, defeating Kent Kinnear and Sven Salumaa 4–6, 6–3, 6–3 in the final.

Seeds

Draw

Finals

Top half

Bottom half

External links
 ATP main draw

Newsweek Champions Cup Doubles